Godzieszówek  (German: Günthersdorf) is a village in the administrative district of Gmina Strzegom, within Świdnica County, Lower Silesian Voivodeship, in south-western Poland. Prior to 1945 it was in Germany.

Typical for the region, the German name of the village derives from the name of the Lokator who brought German farmers to the village For 

The village has a population of 130.

References

Villages in Świdnica County